Batang Anai Football Club (simply known as Batang Anai) is an Indonesian football club based in Padang Pariaman Regency, West Sumatra. They currently compete in the Liga 3 and their homeground is Bukik Bunian Stadium.

Honours
 Liga 3 West Sumatra
 Champion (1): 2017
 Runner-up (2): 2018, 2019

References

External links
  Liga-Indonesia.co.id
  Divisi III LI 2010
Batang Anai FC Instagram

Padang Pariaman Regency
Football clubs in Indonesia
 Football clubs in West Sumatra
Association football clubs established in 2017
2017 establishments in Indonesia